The 2011 VFF National Super League was the qualifying competition for the 2011–12 OFC Champions League.

The club who advanced to this tournament was Amicale FC, Vanuatu's sole representative at the competition.

Teams 
All 5 teams who competed were the top 5 from the 2010–11 Port Vila Premier League, the top division of football in the Port Vila Football Association (the main football association in Vanuatu).
 Amicale FC
 Tafea FC
 Shepherds United
 Tupuji Imere
 Spirit 08

Standings

References

2010–11 in Vanuatuan football
VFF National Super League seasons